Gankino horo is a Bulgarian folk dance written in 11 (undecuple) = 2+2+3+2+2 time (typically  or ) similar to kopanitsa or krivo horo. The name gankino seems to be used mostly in northern Bulgaria. The basic gankino horo is a three-measure dance using the step structure also common in the dances: Dunavsko (Danubian Pravo), Povarnoto (also known as Devetorka in North Macedonia) and Eleno Mome.

The three measures comprise a seven-step grapevine, starting right foot to the right, L cross in front — two measures.  The third measure is a three-step grapevine to the left: left steps left, R cross in back. L to the L.

See also
Bulgarian dances

External links
 Audio file of Gankino horo
 Gankino Horo performed by "Fandujo", an italian acoustic trio
 Barcelona Gipsy Klezmer BalKan Orchestra

Bulgarian dances